Vladimír Pikora (born 3 August 1977, Prague) is a Czech financial market analyst and macroeconomist. He is the chief economist in Next Finance consulting company. In 2021 he established Pikora Invest as a family office.

Life

Pikora graduated from the University of Economics in Prague, where he received his PhD. During his studies, he participated in a number of study visits abroad and successfully passed broker exams. In 2001, the B. I. G. agency awarded him for the accuracy of his forecasts. In 2005, the weekly Týden named him the most quoted Czech analyst in the media.

From 2000 to 2006, Mr Pikora worked as the chief economist in Volksbank. Since 2006 he has been the chief economist in Next Finance, s.r.o., consulting company, where he acts as the CEO and a partner. He has been a member of the Supervisory Board of Czech Export Bank (Česká komerční banka) since 2015.

He is married to Markéta Šichtařová, who is also an economist and the founder of Next Finance. They have 7 children as of April 2021. Together, they have advised on, among other things, the 2011 pension reform and its eventual impacts on people.

Šichtařová and Pikora won the 2015 Magnesia Litera Award for their book, Lumpové a beránci.

Publications
Všechno je jinak aneb Co nám neřekli o důchodech, euru a budoucnosti [Everything Is Different or What They Haven't Told Us About Pensions, the Euro and the Future], Praha: Grada (2011), ; co-authored by Markéta Šichtařová.
Nahá pravda aneb Co nám neřekli o našich penězích a budoucnosti [The Naked Truth or What They Haven't Told Us About Our Money and Our Future], Praha : NF Distribuce (2012), ; co-authored by  Markéta Šichtařová.
Lumpové a beránci [The Villains and The Lambs], Praha: NF Distribuce (2014), ; co-authored Markéta Šichtařová.

References

External links 

 Next Finance profile

1977 births
Living people
21st-century Czech economists
Prague University of Economics and Business alumni
20th-century Czech economists